Irene Miguélez Martínez (born 5 July 2004) is a Spanish footballer who plays as a defender for Villarreal.

Club career
Miguélez started her career at Villarreal B.

References

External links
Profile at La Liga

2004 births
Living people
Women's association football defenders
Spanish women's footballers
Sportspeople from Castellón de la Plana
Footballers from the Valencian Community
Villarreal CF (women) players
Primera División (women) players
Segunda Federación (women) players
Spain women's youth international footballers